Cyrtodactylus payacola  is a species of gecko that is endemic to western Malaysia.

References 

Cyrtodactylus
Reptiles described in 2012